Kerkini is a village and a former municipality in the Serres regional unit, Greece. Since the 2011 local government reform it is part of the municipality Sintiki, of which it is a municipal unit. It is named after ancient Kerkinitis lake (see map of Macedon). The municipal unit has an area of 353.634 km2. Population of the municipal unit 6,695 (2011). The seat was in Rodopoli.

References

Populated places in Serres (regional unit)